Forbidden Territory is a 1934 British thriller film directed by Phil Rosen and starring Gregory Ratoff, Ronald Squire and Binnie Barnes. It was based on the 1933 novel The Forbidden Territory by Dennis Wheatley.

The film, about an Englishman and his son who travel to the Soviet Union to rescue a family member being held in prison, was made at the Lime Grove Studios of Gainsborough Pictures in Shepherd's Bush. The film's sets were designed by the art director Oscar Werndorff.

Plot

Cast
 Gregory Ratoff as Alexei Leshki
 Ronald Squire as Sir Charles Farringdon
 Binnie Barnes as Valerie Petrovna
 Tamara Desni as Marie-Louise
 Barry MacKay as Michael Farringdon
 Anthony Bushell as Rex Farringdon
 Anton Dolin as Jack Straw
 Marguerite Allan as  Fenya
 Boris Ranevsky as Runov

References

Bibliography
 Shaw, Tony. British Cinema and the Cold War: The State, Propaganda and Consensus. I.B.Tauris, 2006.

External links

1934 films
British thriller drama films
Films directed by Phil Rosen
Films set in Moscow
Films set in Romania
Films set in the Soviet Union
Films based on British novels
Films based on works by Dennis Wheatley
Films shot at Lime Grove Studios
British black-and-white films
1930s thriller drama films
1934 drama films
1930s English-language films
1930s British films